is a Japanese actress who specializes in voice acting. She is affiliated with Aoni Production.

Biography
Before entering the world of voice acting, she worked as a stage lighting technician.

She has participation experience in the Miss International Japan beauty pageant.

She was originally affiliated with Aoi Corporation, where she also appeared in Television Dramas, amongst others. In April 2011, she moved to Aoni Production.

Her first voice role was in the anime movie Patema Inverted. Other notable roles include Tetra in Log Horizon, Latifah Fleuranza in Amagi Brilliant Park, and Hotaru Tomoe in Sailor Moon Crystal.

Filmography

Television animation

OVA
 Chain Chronicle (2014) as Juliana
 The Kawai Complex Guide to Manors and Hostel Behavior (2015)
 Strike the Blood II OVA as Kiriha Kisaki

Anime Movie

ONA
 Kyōsōgiga (2012) as male student (ep 1); Miyakoi (ep 2); girl (ep 3)
 Hero Mask (2018–19) as Eve Palmer

Video games
 HeartCatch PreCure! Oshare Collection (2010) as Nanami Shiku
 Original story from Fairy Tail: Gekitotsu! Kardia Daiseidō (2011) as Gemi
 7th Dragon 2020 (2011) as Reimi
 Beast Breakers (2012) as Seria Balaine
 Conception: Ore no Kodomo o Undekure! (2012) as Yuzuha
 Fairy Tail: Portable Guild 2 (2011) as Lily
 Fairy Tail: Zeref Kakusei (2012) as Gemi
 Nendoroid Generation (2012) as Enemy Nendoroid <energy system>; skeleton; wild rabbit; Bisuteri; Kokurei
 STORM LOVER KAI!! (2012)
 Tales of Xillia 2 (2012)
 7th Dragon 2020-II (2013) as Reimi
 The Idolmaster Million Live! (2013) as Megumi Tokoro
 Muv-Luv Alternative: Total Eclipse (2013) as Tatiana Belskaya; Ensign Rebecca Lint
 Magica Wars Zanbatsu (2014) as Minamo Kōsaka
 Granblue Fantasy (2014) as Haaselia
 Miko no Mori (2014) as Sakurako Nitta
 To Heart: Heartful Party (2014) as Yasuko Tsubaki
 Hortensia Saga -Aoi no Kishi-dan- (2015) as
 Kemono Friends (2015) as Kinshikō (Golden Snub-nosed Monkey)
 Lord of Vermilion Arena (2015) as Annerose
 Monmusu Harem (2015) as Reirinka Shimiya
 Private Model (2015) as Akane Hatsukawa
 Shingeki no Bahamut (2015) as Sui and Pene
 Arena of Valor (2016) as Mina
 Exos Heroes (2019) as Iris
 Girls' Frontline as T-5000 and K2
 Atelier Ryza 2: Lost Legends & the Secret Fairy (2020) as Serri Glaus
 Blue Archive (2021) as Kayako Onikata
 Samurai Warriors 5 (2021) as Nōhime/Kicho
 Counter:Side (2021) as Kasukape Yumi (Lee Yumi), Cathy Wade, Yen Xing Lanchester
 Digimon Survive (2022) as Labramon
 Xenoblade Chronicles 3 (2022) as Nimue
 Azur Lane (2022) as Serri Glaus
 Engage Kill (TBA) as Aoi Kotobuki
 Zenless Zone Zero (TBA) as Soldier 11

Drama CD
 Place to Place 3: Tenka Musō no Nyan-dere-ra (2011) as Schoolgirl
 Shimekiri-sama ni Oyurushi wo (2011) as Suimin
 Waratte! Sotomura-san (2012) as Yoshinaga-sensei
 √3 = (Hitonami ni Ogore ya Onago) (2013) as Hoyu Kōzenji
 citrus (2015) as Harumi Taniguchi

Dubbing
Nathalie Emmanuel
 Game of Thrones as Missandei
 The Titan as Tally Rutherford
 The Bling Ring as Sam Moore (Taissa Farmiga)
 Flatliners as Marlo (Nina Dobrev)
 The Perks of Being a Wallflower as Sam (Emma Watson)

TV Drama
 Kasōken no Onna ninth series Episode 8 (August 27, 2009, TV Asahi) - Satsuki Mizuhara
 Castle of Sand (September 10–11, 2011, TV Asahi) - Ritsuko
 Puropōzu Kyōdai ~Umare-jun Betsu Otoko ga Kekkon suru Hōhō~ first night "Hajime-kko ga Kekkon suru Hōhō" (February 21, 2011, Fuji TV)

Movie
 Shizumanu Taiyō (October 24, 2009, Toho)

Discography

Singles

References

External links
Official agency profile 

1985 births
Living people
Aoni Production voice actors
Japanese film actresses
Japanese television actresses
Japanese video game actresses
Japanese voice actresses
Voice actresses from Kanagawa Prefecture
21st-century Japanese actresses